Ardeadoris undaurum is a species of sea slug, a dorid nudibranch, a shell-less marine gastropod mollusk in the family Chromodorididae.

Distribution 
This species is found in the Indian Ocean from Australia to South Africa. The type specimen was found off Carnac Island, Western Australia.

References

Chromodorididae
Gastropods described in 1985